Somers is a town in Kenosha County, Wisconsin, United States. Prior to 2015, the town encompassed all of the village of Somers along with its current area. When the village was incorporated in 2015, the western part of the original town remained as part of the town; however, it was later incorporated into the village as well. The present town largely consists of land along or within the boundaries of Kenosha, and it is slated to become part of Kenosha by 2035.

As of the 2020 census, the town of Somers had a population of 992, compared to a population of 9,597 at the 2010 census, prior to incorporation of the village of Somers.

References

External links
Village and Town of Somers official website

Towns in Kenosha County, Wisconsin
Towns in Wisconsin